"Motiv8" (pronounced "motivate") is a song by American rapper J. Cole, released on April 20, 2018 from his fifth studio album, KOD.

Composition and samples
The song contains an uncredited sample from "Knuck If You Buck", performed by Crime Mob; and excerpts from "Get Money", as written by Roy Ayers, James Bedford, Lamont Porter, Sylvia Striplin and Chris Wallace, and performed by Junior M.A.F.I.A.

Lyrical interpretation
HotNewHipHop said "another track that’s been getting a lot of attention lately is this song called “Motiv8.” [...] Cole hops on this self-produced beat and raps about being motivated to get the money, something he repeats throughout the song & chorus."

Critical reception
Alexis Petridis of The Guardian said "Motiv8 revolves around little more than an eerie keyboard figure and a disembodied cry of “get money” from Lil Kim's guest appearance on the 1995 Junior MAFIA hit of the same title – ripped out of context, it sounds bleak and despairing." KentWired said “Another song I feel like will be played on the radio a lot. Also, another favorite song of mine. This kind of reminds me of Kendrick Lamar’s “Levitate.” However, I love the beginning of this song where it has pretty much a video game sound effect to it.”

Usage in media
The song was featured in the official 2018 NBA Playoffs (Eastern Conference Finals) and the NBA Finals promotion for ESPN.

Commercial performance
Upon its first week of release, "Motiv8" debuted at number 15 on the US Billboard Hot 100.

Charts

Certifications

References

2018 songs
J. Cole songs
Songs written by J. Cole
Song recordings produced by J. Cole
Songs written by the Notorious B.I.G.